Northeastern High School is a public high school near Springfield, Ohio, United States.  It is one of two high schools in the Northeastern Local School District, the other school being Kenton Ridge High School.

State championships
Northeastern High School has won the following Ohio High School Athletic Association state championship:
 Boys Basketball – 1923* 
 * Title won by Plattsburgh High School prior to consolidation into Northeastern in 1952.

References

External links
 District website
 School website
 

High schools in Clark County, Ohio
Public high schools in Ohio